Natsuo is a unisex Japanese given name.

Possible writings
Natsuo can be written using different kanji characters and can mean:
夏雄, "Summer, male".
夏夫, "Summer, husband".
夏緒, "Summer, thread".
夏央, "Summer, central".
夏生, "Summer, living".　
奈津緒
奈津生

The given name can also be written in hiragana or katakana.

People with the name
 , pen name of Mariko Hashioka, Japanese novelist
 , Japanese politician

Fictional characters
, protagonist of the manga series Domestic Girlfriend
, a character in the manga series Loveless
Natsuo Todoroki (轟 夏雄), older brother of Shoto Todoroki from My Hero Academia

Notes

See also
Keston Wee Hing Natsuo Hiura (born 1996), American baseball player

Japanese unisex given names